Eastern Christian High School (ECHS) is a private Christian high school located in North Haledon, in Passaic County, New Jersey, United States.  The high school is a part of the Eastern Christian School Association which also has a middle school (ECMS) in Wyckoff, and an elementary school (ECES) and preschool in Midland Park. ECHS is home to students from middle and northern NJ as well as southern NY. ECHS also offers a one to four year middle and high school program for F-1 Visa Students. 

ECHS currently has 300 enrolled students and 33.5 classroom teachers (on an FTE basis), for a student–teacher ratio of 11:1. Eastern Christian's total student body is comprised of 909 students. The school's student body is 57% White, 15% Asian, 13% Hispanic or Latino, 8% Black and 7% Multiracial.

Academics 
Eastern Christian follows a program called "Faith in Action" in which every student in the high school is required to complete a certain amount of volunteer hours in order to get their high school diploma.  

ECHS offers seven different Humanities and STEM Fields concentrations. Just like a college major, these concentrations allow students to identify their budding interests and talents, then develop skills in a focus area.

Project Acceleration is a set of courses designated for dual credit, which allow a student to receive both high school credit toward a diploma and also college credit from a specified institution. Eastern Christian High School has dual credit courses which are offered in an online format and also dual credit courses which are offered in our classrooms in partnership with Seton Hall University in our Project Acceleration program. Upon completion of a course, the student may receive credits on a college transcript.

For Academic Support, ECHS aspires to help students with academic subject areas study skills, and self-advocacy delivered in three ways:

 The least restrictive environment is being enrolled in the resource room (offered on an alternating or daily basis.) This is a credit class that includes study skills and help with a student’s current academic schedule.
 A greater degree of service is through an inclusion model. Supported through EC staff or County services as in-class support. Teachers with expertise in differentiation work alongside high school staff. As we make the curriculum more accessible for students who learn differently, all students benefit. (Universal design)
 The highest level of intervention is a remediation class that parallels the grade level college prep curriculum.

While ECHS does support students in all academic areas, their most common differentiation takes place in English, Language Arts, and Math.

As the oldest and largest Christian day school in the New York Metropolitan area, Eastern Christian’s commitment to academic excellence is measured by its faculty, facilities, and rigorous curriculum. It is also affiliated with Christian Schools International, which includes 425 school systems in the United States and Canada. The faculty is New Jersey State certified with an average teaching experience of 15 years; almost half having earned advanced degrees.

Athletics & More
The Eastern Christian Eagles participate in the North Jersey Interscholastic Conference, which is comprised of small-enrollment schools in Bergen, Hudson, Morris and Passaic counties. The high school offers 23 teams across 12 sports with 252 students participating in at least one of these offerings.

While 60% of students are involved in the athletic program, ECHS also offers a range of other activities to meet student interests. These include fencing, fly fishing, musical production, astronomy, robotics, gardening and more.

Notable alumni
 Jonas Brothers, Kevin (born 1987) and Joe (born 1989) attended the school.
 Peter Kreeft (born 1937), philosopher at Boston College and The King's College and author of numerous popular books of Christian philosophy, theology, and apologetics.
 Bethany Joy Lenz (born 1981), singer, actress.
 Alexander Noyes (born 1986), drummer for the band Honor Society.
 Katie Sagona (born 1989), actress.
 Antonique Smith (born 1983), actress/singer best known for her starring role as Mimi in Jonathan Larson's Broadway production of Rent and starred as Faith Evans in the film Notorious.

External links 
School website
Data for Eastern Christian High School, National Center for Education Statistics

References

Christian educational institutions
Christian schools in New Jersey
Private high schools in Passaic County, New Jersey